Justice Potter may refer to:

Charles N. Potter (1852–1927), associate justice of the Wyoming Supreme Court
Elisha R. Potter (1811–1882), associate justice of the Rhode Island Supreme Court
Mark Potter (judge) (born 1937), English judge Lord Justice of Appeal of the Court of Appeal of England and Wales
Stephen Potter (judge) (1727–1793), associate justice of the Rhode Island Supreme Court
William W. Potter (Michigan politician) (1869–1940), associate justice and chief justice of the Michigan Supreme Court

See also
 Potter Stewart (1915–1985), associate justice of the United States Supreme Court
Judge Potter (disambiguation)